The California Raisins can refer to

The California Raisins, fictional musical group 
The California Raisins: The Grape Escape, unreleased video game